4 Blocks is a German drama series. It stars Kida Khodr Ramadan as Ali "Toni" Hamadi, the leader of a drug cartel in Berlin-Neukölln which has strong connections with the Arab crime families including his clan. He is forced to postpone his plans to leave the business to live an ordinary life with his wife, played by Maryam Zaree, when his brother-in-law, played by Massiv, is arrested. He brings in Vince Kerner, played by Frederick Lau, a boyhood friend, to restore order in the family business, much to the dislike of Toni's brother Abbas, played by Veysel, who is eager to succeed him as the family leader.

The first season premiered on German pay television channel TNT Serie on May 8, 2017. A second season premiered on October 11, 2018 and a third in November 2019. Internationally, the series airs on Amazon Prime Video.

4 Blocks has received critical acclaim in Germany and has won multiple domestic awards, including the Grimme-Preis for Ramadan, Gelin, and director Marvin Kren, and six German Television Awards (Deutscher Fernsehpreis), including Best Drama Series, Best Actor for Ramadan, and Best Director for Kren.

Plot 
The story begins with the Hamadi Family, one of the most powerful Arab crime families in Berlin which associated with the Al Saafi Family that controls Berlin's drug trades. Ali Hamadi, a wise man in the clan that is calm and collected while his brother Abbas Hamadi is a hotheaded troublemaker. When business goes down with the Al Saafis and the Hamadis lose power because Latif is arrested by the police, they have to find a way to keep their Empire from collapsing. However, with power, money, and traditions go by in the family, it’s hard to survive in weak-willed Berlin for Arabs, so they are willing to go through anything to get on the top.

Season 1 
The Hamadi Clan boss Ali "Toni" Hamadi has lived in Germany with his family for 26 years.  He is the boss of an organized crime family located in the Neukölln borough of Berlin. In order to protect his wife Kalila and daughter Serin he tries to become a legitimate businessman. After his brother-in-law Latif is arrested with nine kilograms of cocaine in the trunk of his car, Ali must do something. He does not want to let his unpredictable brother Abbas take his place as head of the Hamadi Clan. Meanwhile, Ali runs into Vince, an old friend who he trusts. He takes Vince into confidence, not realizing that Vince is actually working with the police as an undercover agent.

Season 2 
Ali visits the Karami Clan in Beirut to see what’s next for the Hamadi Family. Halim Karami is disappointed by the Al Saafis so he throws Omar Al Saafi away to give the Berlin branch to the Hamadis. Conflict begins between the Al Saafis and the Hamadis. The Al Saafi hired Chechens to wipe the Hamadis but he didn’t succeed. However the war ended with the Hamadis victory.

Season 3
Kalila is shot by a hitman hired by Keil. The Hamadis captured Keil but Ali spared him. On the other hand Karami is angry for the money and wants the traitor that betrayed him. With all effects in all side Ali tries to find the traitor, turns out it was Ewa, Abbas's wife. After killing Ewa, Karami still wants to take out the Hamadis. After Kiling Latif he wants to Kill Ali too but failed. So the Hamadis make alliance with the Daud clan which is a rival to the Karami Family. Together they pull up a heist to steal precious diamonds. However, due to Abudi's plan the Hamadis assassinated Karami, but that was the beginning of their failure. The Karamis send their men from Beirut to Berlin to take out Ali and Abbas. Abbas killed by the police while Ali is last seen in his house on the countryside, while the LKA is moving in.

Cast 
 Kida Khodr Ramadan as Ali "Toni" Hamadi, the former leader of the Hamadi crime family. After planning to leave in order to live an ordinary life with his wife, he is forced back into business in order to protect his family.
 Frederick Lau as Vince Kerner, a boyhood friend of Toni and former member of the Southeast Warriors, who returns to Berlin after many years to assist him in restoring order in the family business.
 Veysel Gelin as Abbas Hamadi, Ali's younger brother and the designated new leader of his family's business.
 Almila Bagriacik as Amara Hamadi, Latif's wife and the sister of Ali and Abbas.
 Maryam Zaree as Kalila Hamadi, Ali's wife. She pushes Ali to leave the criminal activities of his family behind to start a legal life and obtain German citizenship.
 Karolina Lodyga as Ewa Niziol, Abbas's wife and the only non-Arab member of the Hamadi Family. She enjoys little respect within the family and pushes Abbas to strengthen his position against Ali.
 Massiv as Latif Hamadi, Amara's husband. He and Abbas organize the family's drug business through his car repair shop.
 Sami Nasser as Jemal Hamadi, a former member of the Southeast Warriors and one of the closest confidants of Ali and Abbas. He is responsible for the smaller crime businesses of the family.
 Erkan Sulcani as Ahmed "Kartoffel" Hamadi, part of the inner circle of the clan, who acts as one of the enforcers of the family.
 Rauand Taleb as Zeki, Issam's best friend and one of the Hamadi family's drug runners. He dreams of working his way up in the family's business.
 Emilio Sakraya as Issam, Zeki's best friend and one of the Hamadi family's drug runners. He is the more deliberate of the two, but Zeki often convinces him to actions which get him into trouble.
 Ronald Zehrfeld as Rainer "Ruffi" Ruff, the president of the Cthuhlu, a rocker club funded by drug trafficking and prostitution. In the light of the Hamadi family's supply difficulties, he tries to take over their territories in Berlin-Neukölln.
 Oliver Masucci as Hagen Kutscha, leader of the police's investigations of the Hamadi family.
 Ludwig Trepte as Nico, the Cthuhlu's drug runner. He tries to lure dealers away from the Hamadi, which causes conflict between him and Zeki and Issam.
 Mousa Suleiman as Halim Karami, Boss of the Karami Clan, one of the most powerful clans that controls Beirut and wants to control Berlin via the Arab crime families of Germany.

Production 
The first episode of the series was shot in July 2016 in Berlin. Locations in the Neukölln and Kreuzberg boroughs were used including the Sonnenallee, the Kottbusser Tor subway station and Görlitzer Park. The budget for the first season was four million euros, including €250,000 they received from the Medienboard Berlin-Brandenburg.

Release 
The first two episodes of the series were shown on 15 February 2017 at the Berlin International Film Festival. The complete first season was broadcast weekly for six weeks from May to June 2017 on TNT Serie. It also aired on free-to-air channel ZDFneo in November 2018.

Amazon secured international broadcasting rights in more than 150 countries, with the first season added on Amazon Prime on October 5, 2017 and season 2 on December 15, 2018. In Summer 2018, it was released in 50 additional countries including Germany, France and Russia.

Episodes

Season 1 (2017)

Season 2 (2018)

Season 3 (2019)

See also
List of German television series

References

External links
 

2017 German television series debuts
German-language television shows
TNT Serie original programming
Television series about organized crime
Grimme-Preis for fiction winners
Television shows set in Berlin
Works about organized crime in Germany